Sapozhnikov (masculine) or Sapozhnikova (feminine) is a Russian surname, derived from the Russian word "сапожник" (cobbler/shoemaker/bootmaker). Notable people with the surname include:

 Andrei Sapozhnikov (born 1971), Russian Soviet ice hockey player
 Anna Sapozhnikova (born 1997), Russian Paralympic athlete
 Nadezhda Sapozhnikova (1877–1942), Russian painter

Occupational surnames
Russian-language surnames